Kari Juhani Rajamäki (born 15 October 1948, in Anjala) is a Finnish politician from the Social Democratic Party and a former Minister of the Interior.

Rajamäki has been MP since 1983 and represents Southern Savonia. Before he became a minister he was profiled in public by demanding more funds for road construction projects.

Rajamäki was the Minister of the Interior of Finland in Jäätteenmäki and Vanhanen cabinets from 2003 to 2007. During his term in office he actively contributed to get more funding for police and handling visa grants.

In municipal politics, Rajamäki has been a member of Varkaus town council since 1973.

References

External links
 Official Website

1948 births
Living people
People from Kouvola
Social Democratic Party of Finland politicians
Ministers of the Interior of Finland
Members of the Parliament of Finland (1983–87)
Members of the Parliament of Finland (1987–91)
Members of the Parliament of Finland (1991–95)
Members of the Parliament of Finland (1995–99)
Members of the Parliament of Finland (1999–2003)
Members of the Parliament of Finland (2003–07)
Members of the Parliament of Finland (2007–11)
Members of the Parliament of Finland (2011–15)